Doug Worthington, Jr. (born August 10, 1987) is a former American football defensive tackle. He was drafted by the Pittsburgh Steelers with the 242nd overall pick in the seventh round of the 2010 NFL Draft. He played college football at Ohio State. He was also a member of the Tampa Bay Buccaneers, Washington Redskins, San Diego Chargers, and St. Louis Rams.

Professional career

Pittsburgh Steelers
Worthington was drafted in the seventh round by the Pittsburgh Steelers in the 2010 NFL draft. The Steelers signed him to a four-year contract. Worthington was waived on September 4, 2010, but signed to the practice squad two days later. On September 7, 2010, Worthington was released.

Tampa Bay Buccaneers
On November 3, 2010, the Tampa Bay Buccaneers signed Worthington to their practice squad.
On December 29, 2010, Worthington was promoted to the active 53-man roster.
Worthington was released on August 5, 2011.

Washington Redskins
On August 7, 2011, the Washington Redskins signed Worthington.
Worthington was waived on September 3, 2011, but signed to the practice squad two days later.
On December 20, 2011, Worthington was promoted to the Redskins' 53-man active roster.
He didn't play any games in the 2011 season.

Worthington was released on August 31, 2012, for final cuts before the start of the 2012 season. The next day after not being claimed off waivers, he was re-signed to the team's practice squad. On September 17, he was promoted to the active roster again to replace Adam Carriker, who was placed on the injured reserve list after suffering a quad injury in Week 2 against the St. Louis Rams. He made his NFL debut in Week 4 against his former team, the Tampa Bay Buccaneers. The Redskins waived-injured Worthington on June 12, 2013, due to a biceps tendon injury. The next day he cleared waivers and was placed on the team's injured reserve.

The Redskins re-signed Worthington to a one-year contract on February 7, 2014, but he was released on August 14, 2014.

San Diego Chargers
Worthington signed with the San Diego Chargers on August 18, 2014. He was released on August 29, 2014.

St. Louis Rams
The St. Louis Rams signed Worthington to their practice squad on December 15, 2014. He signed a futures contract with the Rams on December 31.

Worthington was waived for final roster cuts before the start of the 2015 season on September 1, 2015. He was signed to the team's practice squad on September 6. He was promoted to the active roster on October 28. On November 17, he was waived, but re-signed to the practice squad two days later. On December 31, 2015, Worthington was placed on injured reserve.

References

External links
 Ohio State Buckeyes bio
 Los Angeles Rams bio
 Washington Redskins bio

1987 births
Living people
American football defensive ends
American football defensive tackles
Los Angeles Rams players
Ohio State Buckeyes football players
Pittsburgh Steelers players
Players of American football from New York (state)
Tampa Bay Buccaneers players
San Diego Chargers players
Sportspeople from Erie County, New York
St. Louis Rams players
Washington Redskins players